Edith Grace Houghton (February 10, 1912 – February 2, 2013) was an American professional baseball player and scout. She served in that role until , when she returned to active service in the United States Navy. She had joined the WAVES during World War II.

Early life 
Houghton was a native of the North Philadelphia neighborhood. Around 1917, Edith moved with her parents and nine older brothers and sisters to their brand-new house at 25th and Diamond Streets. Directly across Diamond Street, there was a large park with a baseball diamond. When the field was free, the kids in the neighborhood would start a game of baseball. The first position Edith played was shortstop. Her father, William L. Houghton, distributed goods for a large grocery company. He was also a skilled baseball player who taught his youngest daughter many techniques. As young as age six, Edith posed for photos in a baseball uniform. By the time she was eight, she dressed as the mascot for the Philadelphia police's baseball team. Family, friends, and fans dubbed Edith “The Kid.”

Too young to join a factory team, in 1922 the ten-year-old Edith tried out for the Philadelphia Bobbies, a semi-pro team for non-working girls. Houghton quickly became the star, her fielding and batting skills drew the attention of fans and reporters, as did her youth. Edith was the youngest on a team made up of mostly teenage girls. The Bobbies practiced in Fairmount Park, where Edith was a standout athlete and baseball player.

In 1925, she and the team travelled to Japan to play baseball against men; Houghton was then 13 years old. On September 23, 1925, they boarded a train at the North Broad Street Station, several blocks from Edith's house. Twelve Bobbies, their coach, and two men (to play pitcher and catcher) played eight games on their way to Seattle, en route to Yokohama. Once in Japan, they drew large crowds, especially at first. Edith impressed many Japanese reporters. Although they were contracted to play 15 games for $800, their finances fell through midway through the trip. Half the team headed to Formosa and back to the United States. The other half, including Edith, stayed in Kobe and luckily found a contributor to fund their trip home by December.

Education 
Houghton briefly attended the new Simon Gratz High School, which had many sports that she wanted to play. After six months, however, she went to Philadelphia High School for Girls on Spring Garden Street.

Career 
Edith went on to play for semi-pro baseball teams until she started softball in the 1930s. At that point women were pushed out of baseball into softball. Houghton later played with other women's pro teams such as the Hollywood Girls and the New York Bloomer Girls. In 1942, during World War II, she volunteered for the WAVES (Women Accepted for Volunteer Emergency Services). Although nominally a clerk, she was accepted into the department's baseball team. The Navy newsletter wrote that "enlisted WAVE Houghton... can make any ball team in the country." During her service, she was assigned to the procurement of WAVES and Navy Nurse clothing for the Bureau of Supplies and Accounts in Washington D.C. Houghton eventually became chief storekeeper. In December 1944, Houghton's unit was transferred to New York. In 1945, Houghton was discharged from the WAVES but was recruited again and became the Chief Master of Arms.

After the war, she took her skills to a new level. She approached Phillies’ owner R. R. M. Carpenter Jr. in 1946 asking for an interview, then met with Carpenter and general manager Herb Pennock. Soon the Phillies made national news: they hired Houghton as Major League Baseball's first female scout. From 1946 to 1952, she scouted players and signed fifteen to contracts, mostly from Philadelphia-area high schools.

She left the team in 1952 and rejoined the Navy, where she served during the Korean and Vietnam wars and retired as a chief petty officer.

In 1964, Houghton left Philadelphia and moved to Sarasota, Florida, where she lived until her death on February 2, 2013, eight days before her 101st birthday.

See also
 Women in baseball

References

1912 births
2013 deaths
American centenarians
United States Navy personnel of the Korean War
American female baseball players
Major League Baseball scouts
Philadelphia Phillies scouts
United States Navy sailors
WAVES personnel
Women centenarians
Women in warfare post-1945
Baseball players from Philadelphia
21st-century American women